The Whakanekeneke River is a river of the Northland Region of New Zealand's North Island. It flows generally west from its origins north of Lake Ōmāpere, and flows into the Waihou River, an arm of the Hokianga Harbour.

See also
List of rivers of New Zealand

References

Far North District
Rivers of the Northland Region
Rivers of New Zealand